Poinson-lès-Grancey (literally Poinson near Grancey) is a commune in the Haute-Marne department in north-eastern France.

Geography
The Ource flows northeastward through the southern part of the commune, then forms its north-eastern border.

See also
Communes of the Haute-Marne department

References

Poinsonlesgrancey